USS Stagbush (AN-69/YN-93) was an  which served with the U.S. Navy in the western Pacific Ocean theatre of operations during World War II. Her career was without major incident, and she returned home safely after the war with one battle star to her credit.

Built in Slidell, Louisiana
Stagbush (AN-69) was laid down on 9 February 1943 by Canulette Shipbuilding Company, Inc., Slidell, Louisiana; launched on 29 January 1944; and commissioned on 30 August 1944.

World War II service
Stagbush sailed for Melville, Rhode Island, on 8 September only to be caught in a storm on the 14th off Cape Hatteras, North Carolina, which required that she be drydocked after her shakedown. She was in the Snow Shipyards, Rockland, Maine, from 12 October to 6 December 1944.

When she was ready for sea again, Stagbush sailed for Hawaii via the Panama Canal; San Diego, California; and Tiburon, Mexico, where she took on a load of nets. She arrived at Pearl Harbor on 12 February 1945 and sailed the next day via Eniwetok; Ulithi; and Leyte, Philippine Islands, for the Ryukyu Islands.

Stagbush arrived at Kerama Retto on 26 March and began laying nets to protect the anchorage. She remained there until mid-July when, after removing the nets, she moved to Buckner Bay, Okinawa. The ship sailed for Wakayama, Japan, on 8 September, to assist in clearing mines. A few days later, she laid swept channel buoys in Kii Suido after minesweepers had cleared the entrance. She then returned to Okinawa for acoustic minesweeping gear to be transported to Japan.

End-of-war activity
Stagbush remained at Sasebo for a few days and then moved to Fukuoka in late October to act as tender for auxiliary motor minesweepers. This duty was completed on 2 December 1945 and the net layer got underway for San Francisco, California.

Post-war decommissioning
Stagbush was decommissioned at Mare Island, California, on 26 March 1946 and struck from the Navy List on 21 May. She was sold to Robert A. Martinolich in April 1947 and converted for merchant service. She burned at Norfolk, Virginia, on 16 October 1954.

Honors and awards
Stagbush received one battle star for World War II service.

References
 
 NavSource Online: Service Ship Photo Archive - YN-93 / AN-69 Stagbush

 

Ailanthus-class net laying ships of the United States Navy
Ships built in Slidell, Louisiana
1944 ships
World War II net laying ships of the United States
Tenders of the United States Navy
World War II auxiliary ships of the United States